Seehausen is a town in the district of Stendal, in Saxony-Anhalt, Germany. In January 2010 it absorbed the former municipalities Beuster, Geestgottberg and Losenrade, and in September 2010 Schönberg.

Seehausen is the seat of the Verbandsgemeinde Seehausen (Altmark).

History
The oldest document in which Seehausen was mentioned was written in 1174. Seehausen developed on river Aland in the middle of the 12th century , but the first settlement called "Altstadt" was left in the middle of the 14th century and a new town was laid out in the north. Many immigrants from the Netherlands settled down in the area after 1251. In the Middle Ages Seehausen developed into a wealthy trade centre which was surrounded by a moat and a wall. It became a member of the Hanseatic League in 1359. As river Aland was navigable goods produced in Seeland and the area around like wheat, linnen and wool could easily be transported to the other hanseatic towns and cities. A small harbour on river Elbe just five kms from Seehausen was built in 1409.

Sights
The centre of Seehausen is St.Petri Church which was built 1170-1180 in a romanesque style and transformed into a gothic hall church between 1440 - 1480. The height of its impressive towers amounts to 62 metres. Its baroque pulpit dates from 1710, and the wood carvings of the altar, a winged altarpiece were made in the Netherlands in the 15th century  The organ which dates from 1867 was renovated in 2014.

The Town Hall was built of bricks in neogothic style and inaugurated in 1883.

A part of the medieval town wall with a height of up to 4 metres dating from the 15th century is left and can be visited in Petristraße. The ancient rampart and moat is well-preserved, e.g. close to the former gate "Beustertor" at Hoher Wall Street. Beustertor (15th century) gate is the only one of five gates which was not demolished in the 19th century. It was the most important gate because the road to the harbour on river Elbe started from here.

Seehausen has many well-preserved half-timbered houses, especially in Beusterstraße, Steinstraße and Petristraße (built around 1750). The church of a former monastery which had been dissolved in 1547 was transformed into a salt depot and named "Salzkirche (Salt Church)". It was built around 1460 in a brick gothic style typical for hanseatic towns.  After a renovation in 1997 it was transformed into a hall for concerts and other cultural events. - The Turmuhrenmuseum is an exhibition  of church-clocks and historical clocks.

There are various sights in the villages which were incorporated into Seehausen in 2010, e.g. St.Nikolaus Church (built from 1150 to 1184) in Beuster.  In Beuster the Blaulichtmuseum is worth a visit as well. It is a collection of army, police and ambulance vehicles. Two megalith graves from stone age which are about 5,000 years old can be visited near Bretsch.

Economy and infrastructure
Seehausen has a railway station on the Magdeburg-Wittenberge railway which was built from  1846-1849. There are good rail connections to Berlin and Hamburg via Wittenberge, Seehausen's neighbouring town in the North.The town will be connected to Magdeburg and to the harbour of Wismar by two exits of motorway 14 which is under construction. The inauguration is planned for 2025. Agriculture and food processing have always played an important part in the Altmark. The metal-working industry is a most important economic factor of Seehausen and tourism is gaining importance as well. Tourism in Altmark is benefiting from the trend towards nature and activeholidays.

Sports and leisure
Hiking, cycling and horse-riding are common in Seehausen and its surroundings. Schillerhain, a large park in the South of Seehausen was laid out as early as 1852. It was inaugurated as a public park and named after the playwright  Friedrich Schiller in 1859. Waldbad, a public outdoor swimming pool in the park, founded in 1938 and renovated several times, is visited by many locals and tourists.

Gallery

Notable people
Johann Joachim Winckelmann (1717–1768), archaeologist and art historian, worked in Seehausen as a teacher from 1743-1748.
Minna Nanitz, operatic mezzo-soprano, was born in Seehausen.

References

External links

Stendal (district)
Members of the Hanseatic League